Placer, officially the Municipality of Placer (Surigaonon: Lungsod nan Placer), is a 4th class municipality in the province of Surigao del Norte, Philippines. According to the 2020 census, it has a population of 29,616 people.

History 
In 1850, the town was founded by Captain Felipe Custodio and Capitan Luis Patino. It was named "Placer" (Spanish for "pleasure" or "delight") by Custodio in reference to the happiness derived from local gold mining, as well as the abundant fish and rice harvests. In 1860, this name was officially approved.

In 1930, the municipality lost some of its territory when the Municipality of Mainit was formed, and again in 1947, when the Municipality of Tagana-an was established.

World War II 
After the Japanese obtained the surrender of American and Filipino troops on Mindanao in May and June 1942, Placer, along with much of Mindanao, remained free of Japanese occupation. In late September 1943, Japanese troops landed and occupied Placer. Their goals seemed to be to fill drums with oil from a storage tank there for their use and to search for lumber. About 300 to 400 Japanese troops were in town. Some began moving south toward Claver. On October 10, guerrillas under American leadership attacked with 135 men from both the north and south to dislodge the Japanese from Placer. This attack failed, leaving the town in Japanese hands.

Geography 
Placer is in the northeast of Mindanao Island, facing the Hinatuan Passage to the east. Its territory includes the small islands of Tinago, Banga, and Mahaba, as well as half of Masapelid Island where barangays Ellaperal, Lakandula, and Sani-sani are located.

Its topography consists of low rising hills that are interspersed by plains.

Barangays
Placer is politically subdivided into 20 barangays. In 1956, the sitios of Santa Cruz, Anislagan, Alangalang, Soyoc, and Pananay-an were converted into barrios, while barrio Macalaya was divided into Upper and Lower Macalaya.

 Amoslog
 Anislagan 
 Bad-as (contains the intersection of the Pan-Philippine Highway (or National Highway) & the Surigao-Davao Coastal Road)
 Boyongan
 Bugas-bugas
 Central (Poblacion)
 Ellaperal (Nonok)
 Ipil (Poblacion)
 Lakandula
 Mabini
 Macalaya
 Magsaysay (Poblacion)
 Magupange
 Pananay-an
 Panhutongan
 San Isidro
 Sani-sani
 Santa Cruz
 Suyoc
 Tagbongabong

Climate

Demographics

Economy

References

External links

  Placer Profile at the DTI Cities and Municipalities Competitive Index
[ Philippine Standard Geographic Code]
Philippine Census Information

Municipalities of Surigao del Norte